The North Street Friends Meetinghouse is a brick structure on Brick Church Road near Aurora, New York.  It is significant for its associations with abolition, the Underground Railroad and the Women's Rights Movement in Central New York.  It was added to the National Register of Historic Places in 2005.

References

Churches on the National Register of Historic Places in New York (state)
Churches completed in 1836
19th-century Quaker meeting houses
Quaker meeting houses in New York (state)
Buildings and structures in Cayuga County, New York
National Register of Historic Places in Cayuga County, New York